Hughes County is a county located in south central U.S. state of Oklahoma. As of the 2010 census, the population was 14,003. Its county seat is Holdenville. The county was named for W. C. Hughes, an Oklahoma City lawyer who was a member of the Oklahoma Constitutional Convention.

History
The area now occupied by Hughes County was part of Indian Territory in the 19th Century. The Creeks settled in the northern part, which fell within the Wewoka District of the Creek Nation, while the Choctaws settled in the southern, which fell within portions of Atoka County and Tobucksy County of the Choctaw Nation. In 1834, Camp Holmes was established and used as a base for the Dodge-Leavenworth Expedition. It was near Edwards' Store on Little River, one of the first settlements in this area. Also, following Quapaw removal in 1834, several small groups of Quapaw dispersed throughout Indian Territory. There were absentee groups of Quapaw living along the Red River and in Creek, Choctaw and Cherokee territory. There was a Quapaw settlement near camp Holmes in Hughes County.

When the Choctaw, Oklahoma and Gulf Railroad built in 1895, the Edward's settlement was moved north for access to the railroad. The town established there was named Holden, for James Franklin Holder, a railroad official. However, the Post Office Department would not accept that name because it was too similar to the name Holder. The town was renamed Holdenville. The post office opened November 15, 1895. Holdenville incorporated in 1898.

Hughes County was created at statehood and named for W. C. Hughes, an Oklahoma City lawyer who was a member of the Oklahoma Constitutional Convention.

Geography
The county is located in the Sandstone Hills physiographic region. It is drained by the North Canadian River, Canadian River, and Little River.

The county includes Holdenville and Wetumka lakes.

Major highways
  U.S. Highway 75
  U.S. Highway 270
  State Highway 9
  State Highway 27
  State Highway 48

Adjacent counties
 Okfuskee County (north)
 McIntosh County (northeast)
 Pittsburg County (east)
 Coal County (south)
 Pontotoc County (southwest)
 Seminole County (west)

Demographics

As of the census of 2000, there were 14,154 people, 5,319 households, and 3,675 families residing in the county.  The population density was 18 people per square mile (7/km2).  There were 6,237 housing units at an average density of 8 per square mile (3/km2).  The racial makeup of the county was 72.77% White, 4.48% Black or African American, 16.18% Native American, 0.21% Asian, 0.02% Pacific Islander, 0.98% from other races, and 5.36% from two or more races.  2.49% of the population were Hispanic or Latino of any race. 94.3% spoke English, 2.6% Muskogee and 2.5% Spanish as their first language.

There were 5,319 households, out of which 28.80% had children under the age of 18 living with them, 53.50% were married couples living together, 11.30% had a female householder with no husband present, and 30.90% were non-families. 28.60% of all households were made up of individuals, and 16.00% had someone living alone who was 65 years of age or older.  The average household size was 2.42 and the average family size was 2.96.

In the county, the population was spread out, with 23.20% under the age of 18, 8.00% from 18 to 24, 27.20% from 25 to 44, 23.20% from 45 to 64, and 18.60% who were 65 years of age or older.  The median age was 39 years. For every 100 females there were 105.80 males.  For every 100 females age 18 and over, there were 105.50 males.

The median income for a household in the county was $22,621, and the median income for a family was $29,153. Males had a median income of $22,337 versus $18,029 for females. The per capita income for the county was $12,687.  About 16.70% of families and 21.90% of the population were below the poverty line, including 27.40% of those under age 18 and 17.60% of those age 65 or over.

Politics
Despite the county being home to a significant Native American population and a wide Democratic registration advantage, the county has not voted that way in presidential elections in the 21st century. Following the lead of most rural counties nationwide, the Republican Party candidate has won at least 60% of the vote in the county since 2008, with Donald Trump topping out at 79.8% of the vote in 2020.

Economy
Agriculture and cattle raising have long been important to the county economy. Primary crops have been cotton, wheat, corn, oats, peanuts, and soybeans. The most important other employers in the county are: Davis Correctional Center (which is operated by Corrections Corporation of America), Tyson Foods, Wes Watkins Technology Center, and Aquafarms, which has since gone out of business.

Healthcare
Hughes County has one level 4 hospital, Holdenville General Hospital, a city-owned hospital (public trust) under the Holdenville Public Works Authority, opened in 1969 as a 55 licensed bed general medical-surgical hospital. The hospital experienced a fire on May 18, 2002.  On June 30, 2002, the renovated hospital reopened with 25 licensed beds, and on July 1, 2002, was re-designated by CMS as a Critical Access Hospital.  This designation effects the way Medicare reimburses the hospital.  In 1998, the city formed the Holdenville Hospital Authority. In July 2011, the hospital became a Tier 1 Affiliate with St. Anthony Hospital.  This allows collaboration between the hospitals to improve services and support for patient transfers to higher levels of care when needed.

In 1979 Hughes County Commissioners established a 522 Ambulance Service Board, and Opened Hughes County EMS.  Hughes County EMS is an ALS level service licensed by the State of Oklahoma, with Paramedics on every unit.  The system operates 4 units, 2 out of Holdenville (EMS 1 and EMS 3) and Horntown (EMS 2 and EMS 4) during certain times of the year, Horntown functions as a posting point with the crews in Calvin and Wetumka.

Communities

 Allen
 Atwood
 Calvin
 Carson
 Dustin
 Gerty
 Holdenville (county seat)
 Horntown
 Lamar
 Spaulding
 Stuart
 Wetumka
 Yeager

NRHP sites

The following sites are in Hughes County are listed on the National Register of Historic Places:
 Dustin Agricultural Building, Dustin
 Holdenville Armory, Holdenville
 Holdenville City Hall, Holdenville
 Levering Mission, Wetumka
 Moss School Gymnasium, Holdenville
 Spaulding School Gymnasium--Auditorium, Spaulding
 Stuart Hotel, Stuart
 John E. Turner House, Holdenville
 Wetumka Armory, Wetumka
 Wetumka Cemetery Pavilion and Fence, Wetumka

References

Further reading
 Womack, Craig, Rosemary McCombs Maxey, and Southern Spaces staff. "Fife Family Cemetery", Southern Spaces, September 15, 2008.

External links
 Encyclopedia of Oklahoma History and Culture - Hughes County
 Oklahoma Digital Maps: Digital Collections of Oklahoma and Indian Territory

 
1907 establishments in Oklahoma
Populated places established in 1907